Valle Airport  is a privately-owned public use airport located  north of Williams, Arizona, United States. Valle is the second location of Planes of Fame Air Museum.

Planes of Fame 
The Valle branch of Planes of Fame opened in 1995 because the Chino collection had grown so greatly an additional facility was needed. 40 of the museum's 150 aircraft are kept in Valle, many of which are flyable.  A Pacific Airlines Martin 404 and a Western Airlines Convair 240 are displayed alongside Arizona highway 64 30 miles south of Grand Canyon National Park.

Facilities and aircraft 
It has one runway:
 1/19 measuring 4,199 x 45 feet (1,280 x 14 m) with an asphalt surface

For the 12-month period ending April 20, 2009, the airport had 6,500 general aviation aircraft operations, an average of 18 per day. At that time there were six aircraft based at this airport, all single-engine.

Historical airline service 

Trans World Airlines (TWA) served Grand Canyon National Park via the Valle Airport during the late 1940s.  According to a Trans World timetable which appeared in the October 1948 Official Airline Guide, Valle was a stop on transcontinental flights operated by TWA with routings of Philadelphia – Pittsburgh – Chicago – Kansas City – Wichita – Amarillo – Albuquerque – Winslow, AZ – Grand Canyon (Valle Airport) – Boulder City, NV – Las Vegas – Los Angeles and also Baltimore – Washington, D.C. – Columbus, OH – Dayton – Indianapolis – St. Louis – Kansas City – Topeka – Wichita – Amarillo – Santa Fe, NM – Winslow, AZ – Grand Canyon (Valle Airport) – Las Vegas – Los Angeles.

References 

Airports in Coconino County, Arizona